George Cove was a Canadian inventor, known primarily for early solar electric generation equipment.

Biography
George Cove was born in Amherst, Nova Scotia, in 1863 or 1864. In 1904–05, Cove developed his 'solar electric generator' which he displayed at the Metropole Building in Halifax, Nova Scotia. Word of this device reached American investors, and a plant to develop more devices was planned in Somerville, Massachusetts. In 1906, Cove patented a device for capturing tidal power for which he won a gold medal from the Canadian government for his model of the machine and a plan for harnessing the tides of the Bay of Fundy. In 1909–10, Cove maintained a workshop in New York at 118 Maiden Lane to manufacture solar electric generators. In 1909, Cove was kidnapped and offered $25,000 and a house to stop promoting his devices. He refused and was released at the Bronx Zoo. Cove accused a former investor, Frederick W. Huestis of organizing the kidnapping. After the kidnapping, the business shuttered.

His father Joseph Cove patented many mechanical devices. His mother, Ann, was also born in Nova Scotia, and her parents were from Ireland.

Legacy
It has been speculated that Cove may have invented a photovoltaic panel 40 years before Bell Labs did in 1950.

See also
Timeline of solar energy
Charles Fritts

References

1860s births
19th-century Canadian inventors
20th-century Canadian inventors
People from Amherst, Nova Scotia
Businesspeople from Nova Scotia
Canadian expatriates in the United States
Kidnapped Canadian people